Matt Johnson (born 15 August 1961) is an English singer-songwriter best known as the vocalist and only constant member of his band The The. He is also a film soundtrack composer (Cineola), publisher (Fifty First State Press), broadcaster (Radio Cineola), and conservationist/local activist.

Early life
Johnson grew up with his three brothers, Eugene, Andrew (the artist Andy Dog Johnson), and Gerard, in east London. Much of his youth was spent in or around the Two Puddings, a London pub run by his family over the course of 40 years.

Music career
In 1979, Johnson placed an advert in NME looking for like-minded fans of the Velvet Underground, the Residents and Throbbing Gristle to form a band with him. The The began as a duo, then a four-piece, then a singular entity with a rotating cast of musicians that has included Johnny Marr, Simon Fisher Turner and Sinéad O'Connor. "I like to think of The The as a fluid thing", Johnson said in a 1993 Melody Maker interview. "People can work with me, then stop for a bit, then work again."

In 1981, Johnson released the album Burning Blue Soul on 4AD under his own name (since re-released under the name The The), still regarded by some as a much overlooked masterpiece. By 1983 Johnson and Keith Laws the artists signed to Some Bizzare  that place the record with CBS to distribute  Some Bizzare  released The The's debut album Soul Mining now distributed by Sony . By 1986, Some Bizzare produced and released The The their second album Infected, which reached number 14 in the UK Albums Chart and remained in the chart for 30 weeks, making it the band's most commercially successful album to date.  Infected: The Movie was the screen accompaniment to the album.

The The went on Some Bizzare  release further albums through Sony Music including Mind Bomb (1989), Dusk (1993), Hanky Panky (1995), NakedSelf (2000) and compilation album 45 RPM: The Singles of The The (2002).

Johnson's younger brother Eugene died in 1989.  The impact of this death on Matt Johnson and his creativity is a subject of the 2017 documentary THE INERTIA VARIATIONS, directed by Johanna St Michaels, which focuses on the life of Matt Johnson and the team who surround him.  The film is named after an original collection of poetry by John Tottenham, and was later shortlisted for the 'Best Q Film' award in [[Q (magazine)|Q magazine]]'s 'Q' Awards.

Despite not releasing any new music as The The over the course of 15 years prior to 2017, Johnson worked as founder and broadcaster of Radio Cineola, and also heavily collaborated with his brother Gerard, composing the full soundtrack for two of Gerard's films; Tony (2009) and Hyena (2014).

To coincide with the 2017 release of The Inertia Variations, Johnson collaborated with Johnny Marr again and released The The's first single in over 15 years - 'We Can't Stop What's Coming' under his own record label Cineola. Johnson dedicated this track to his late brother Andy Dog Johnson who died in 2016.

As well as a new single, Johnson released the Radio Cineola Trilogy Boxset on vinyl and CD format. In October 2017 The The also announced a comeback series of dates in June 2018 and will be playing live at three venues in London, UK including the Royal Albert Hall. The The are also due to appear as a headline act at Festival N°6 in 2018.

In November 2017, Johnson announced that he was hoping to form a new band and release new music by 2018.

2018 comeback
In June 2018, The The kicked off the first three London dates of the tour, which was expanded in-flight to accommodate not only North America but also four Australian dates in both Sydney and Melbourne. The original line-up for the tour was:

 Matt Johnson - vocals, guitar
 Barrie "Little Barrie" Cadogan - lead guitar
 James Eller - bass
 Earl Harvin - drums, percussion
 D C Collard - keyboards

During the course of the tour the lineup was changed slightly only twice; due to prior commitments Earl Harvin was replaced for the Australian leg of the tour by Geoff Dugmore.

References

Further reading
 
 Fraser, Neil (2022). Long Shadows, High Hopes: The Life and Times of Matt Johnson and The The (Updated Edition).'' Omnibus Press. ISBN 9781913172442

External links
 This Is  Day - Official Site
 Fifty First State Press - Official Site
 4AD artist page

1961 births
Living people
Epic Records artists
English film score composers
English male singer-songwriters
English new wave musicians
British post-punk musicians
British alternative rock musicians
English record producers
English rock singers
English rock guitarists
English male guitarists
English male film score composers
4AD artists
Musicians from London
The The members
Male new wave singers
Marc and the Mambas members